Milton Murray Holland (August 1, 1844 – May 15, 1910) was a Union Army soldier during the American Civil War and a recipient of America's highest military decoration—the Medal of Honor—for his actions at the Battle of Chaffin's Farm.

Biography

Holland was born as the son of white slaveowner Bird Holland (killed in action at the Battle of Pleasant Hill) and Matilda, an enslaved African-American woman. He joined the Army from Athens, Ohio. At the Athens County Fairgrounds he signed to the recruitment rolls 149 young black men and raised what was to become Company C of the 5th United States Colored Infantry.  He was serving as a Sergeant Major (a temporary assignment) in the 5th USCI when his unit participated in the Battle of Chaffin's Farm on September 29, 1864 in Virginia. Three days before the end of the war, on April 6, 1865, he was issued the Medal of Honor for his actions at Chaffin's Farm. He left the army in September 1865.

Holland's wife was Virginia W. Dickey. Milton Holland died from a heart attack at the age of 65 and was buried in Arlington National Cemetery, Arlington County, Virginia.

Medal of Honor citation
Rank and organization: Sergeant Major, 5th U.S. Colored Troops.
Place and date: At Chaffin's Farm, Virginia, September 29, 1864.
Entered service at: Athens, Ohio.
Born: 1844, Holland Quarters, Panola County, Texas.
Date of issue: April 6, 1865.

Citation:

Took command of Company C, after all the officers had been killed or wounded, and gallantly led it.

See also

List of Medal of Honor recipients
List of American Civil War Medal of Honor recipients: G–L
List of African American Medal of Honor recipients
Melvin Claxton and Mark Puls, Uncommon valor : a story of race, patriotism, and glory in the final battles of the Civil War, (Wiley, 2006)

References

1844 births
1910 deaths
African Americans in the American Civil War
United States Army Medal of Honor recipients
Burials at Arlington National Cemetery
Union Army soldiers
People of Ohio in the American Civil War
People from Austin, Texas
American Civil War recipients of the Medal of Honor
20th-century African-American people